Muniz Freire is a municipality located in the Brazilian state of Espírito Santo. Its population was 17,319 (2020) and its area is 680 km².

References

Municipalities in Espírito Santo